A heat wave is a prolonged period of unusually hot weather.

Heat Wave or heatwave  may refer to:

Fictional characters
 Heat Wave (comics), a fictional supervillain from the DC universe
 Heatwave (Transformers), a fictional character in the Transformers universe

Films
 Heat Wave (1935 film), a British comedy
 The House Across the Lake, a 1954 film released as Heat Wave in the US
 Heatwave!, a 1974 film with Ben Murphy and Bonnie Bedelia
 Heatwave (film), a 1982 Australian film directed by Phillip Noyce
 Heat Wave (1990 film), an American television film
 Heat Wave (2009 American film), a television film featuring Jamie Luner
 Heat Wave (2009 Canadian film), featuring Marie-Thérèse Fortin
 Heat Wave (2011 film), a French drama film
 Heat Wave (2015 film), a French film

Music

Groups
 Heatwave (band) an international funk/disco music band
 Heatwave (English band), a London-based band active between 1969 and 1972
The Heatwave, a dancehall sound system and production crew from London

Albums 
 Heat Wave (Ahmad Jamal album), 1966
 Heat Wave (Cal Tjader and Carmen McRae album), 1982
 Heat Wave (Martha and the Vandellas album), 1963
 Heat Wave (The Jazz Crusaders album), 1963 
 Heatwave (album), a 1986 album by Univers Zero
 Heatwave, a 2021 EP by A.C.T

Songs 
 "Heat Wave" (Alphabeat song), 2010
 "Heat Wave" (Irving Berlin song), 1933
 "Heat Wave" (Martha and the Vandellas song), a 1963 Holland–Dozier–Holland song recorded by Martha and the Vandellas, and later recorded by Linda Ronstadt and The Who
 "Heatwave" (Robin Schulz song), 2015, featuring Akon
 "Heatwave" (Wiley song), 2012
 "Heat Waves", a song by Glass Animals from the album Dreamland
 "Heat Wave", a song by Snail Mail from the album Lush
 "Heatwave", a song by the Blue Nile from the album A Walk Across the Rooftops

Other arts, entertainment, and media
 Heat Wave (novel), a novel attributed to fictional character Richard Castle of the TV series Castle
 Heatwave (festival), a music festival held in 1980 at Mosport, Canada
 Heatwave (magazine), an anarchist magazine in the 1960s by Charles Radcliffe
 ECW Heat Wave, a pay-per-view event by the now-defunct Extreme Championship Wrestling

See also 
 Heat burst
 Heat haze, a type of mirage caused by refraction of light in hot air
 Wave of Heat, a 2010 album by Izzy Stradlin